Ernesto Antonio Belis (born February 1, 1909) was an Argentinian football defender who played for Argentina in the 1934 FIFA World Cup. He also played for Defensores de Belgrano.

Fifa World Cup Career

International goals
Argentina's goal tally first

References

External links

Argentine footballers
Argentina international footballers
Association football defenders
1934 FIFA World Cup players
1909 births
Year of death missing